The Dean of Winchester is the head of the Chapter of Winchester Cathedral in the city of Winchester, England, in the Diocese of Winchester. Appointment is by the Crown. The first incumbent was the last Prior, William Kingsmill, Catherine Ogle was installed in February 2017.

List of deans

Early modern
1541–1549 William Kingsmill
1549 Roger Tonge
1549–1554 John Mason (layman)
1554–1559 Edmund Steward
1559–1565 John Warner
1565–1572 Francis Newton
1573–1580 John Watson
1580–1589 Lawrence Humphrey
1589–1600 Martin Heton
1600–1609 George Abbot
1609–1616 Thomas Morton
1616–1654 John Young
1660–1665 Alexander Hyde
1666–1679 William Clarke
1679–1692 Richard Meggot
1692–1722 John Wickart
1722–1729 William Trimnel
1729–1739 Charles Naylor
1739–1748 Zachary Pearce

1748–1760 Thomas Cheyney
1760–1769 Jonathan Shipley
1769–1804 Newton Ogle

Late modern
1804–1805 Robert Holmes
1805–1840 Thomas Rennell
1840–1872 Thomas Garnier
1872–1883 John Bramston
1883–1894 George Kitchin
1894–1902 William Stephens
1903–1919 William Furneaux
1919–1930 Holden Hutton
1931–1958 Gordon Selwyn
1958–1961 Norman Sykes
1961–1969 Oswin Gibbs-Smith
1969–1986 Michael Stancliffe
1987–1996 Trevor Beeson
1996–2005 Michael Till
2006–2016 James Atwell
2017–present Catherine Ogle

References

Winchester Cathedral